The Perry-Carpenter Grist Mill is a historic mill at 364 Moonstone Beach Road in South Kingstown, Rhode Island.  It is a small, single-story wood-frame structure set on a granite foundation close to the east side of the road.  Its property includes the historic head and tail races which provide the water power for the mill.  The mill was built c. 1716 by James Perry, and was moved to its present location sometime before 1789.  It is the only one of four known mills of the period to survive, and is likely the oldest corn mill in the state that is still operational.

The mill was listed on the National Register of Historic Places in 1990.

See also
National Register of Historic Places listings in Washington County, Rhode Island

References

External links
 Carpenter's Grist Mill

Industrial buildings completed in 1716
Buildings and structures in South Kingstown, Rhode Island
Agricultural buildings and structures on the National Register of Historic Places in Rhode Island
Grinding mills in Rhode Island
National Register of Historic Places in Washington County, Rhode Island
Grinding mills on the National Register of Historic Places
1716 establishments in the Thirteen Colonies